Benjamin Twos are Bridge opening conventions. They cover all opening two bids in suit; 2, 2 , 2  and 2 . Of these opening bids, the 2  and 2  are strong opening bids, without a necessary connection to the suit bid whilst  2  and 2  are weak, preemptive bids indicating a six good cards  or  hand without much strength in the other suits. Typically the hand isn't fit for a normal 1  or 1  opening. But weak (or preemptive) opening bids at the second level are in common use in most natural bidding systems today. Equally, the 2  opening bid, has been reserved for the very strong opening hands.

It's the approach to both the 2  and 2  openings that stands out in this opening convention. Where the 2  opening bid still is strong and showing a so far unknown strong 6-card suit, with limits in HCPs around 17-23. And the 2  openings is used for all distributions from around 24 HCP. In other words and as opening bids at the second level, both minors are used to show two different levels of strength.

Game Forcing Two Diamonds 
This opening bid can well be said to be the main feature of Benjamin Twos. By starting the bidding with 2 , opener demands of the partner to keep the bidding open until at least a game has been reached. For balanced (and semi-balanced) hands a common requirement is to have at least 24 HCP on the own hand, but can well be less with a long solid suit.

Benjamin Strong Two Clubs 
Benjamin's opening 2  is very similar to the regular Strong two clubs convention, but as a stronger option is available, the requirements for Benjamin's version can be slightly weaker (and usually limited to max 23 HCP). The 2  opening reveals either a good 6 card (or longer) suit in any suit and about 17-23 HCP or a balanced hand with 22-23 HCP. With an even better hand, the opening 2  should be used instead.

Opening Examples 

Examples: 
 A Q 10 6 
 K Q J 10 3 2 
 A J 
 5

This hand, with a strong 6 card  and 17 HCP is qualified for a 2 opening, but not strong enough to demand the game already in the opening bid.

 A K Q J 
 K Q J 10 3 
 A K J
 5

This even stronger hand, lacks a 6 card suit - but counts 24 HCP and can hence be opened on 2. The opener should now not be worried
to not be given a chance to speak again, as long as the bidding has not reached at least the level of a game. In the rare cases, when the bidding has reached 3NT (a game), but one of the two players of a couple bids 4 / (which is a higher bid, but not a game), the bidding must still reach at least a game.

History
The Benjamin convention was devised by Scotsman Albert Benjamin of Glasgow (1909-2006). The concept is also known as French Two Bids and also Unnamed Strong Two Bid Openings. As a feature of the Acol bidding system, the Benjamin Two Bids are employed to indicate an opening, which almost guarantees a game holding. These multiple designations arise from the fact that the concept has found a certain popularity in European countries and have been given national designations, which have then been translated. Benjamin Twos has become popular at some internet duplicate Bridge pages.

References

Bridge conventions